Glenn Hutchins is an American businessman and investor. He is a private equity investor focused on the technology sector, chairman of North Island and co-founder of Silver Lake Partners.

Career
After studying at The Lawrenceville School and graduating in 1973, Hutchins earned an AB from Harvard College in 1977 and began his career as a credit analyst at Chemical Bank  In 1984, he finished a joint JD/MBA program from Harvard Business School and Harvard Law School, which he completed simultaneously.  Following his graduation, Hutchins began his career in private equity at Thomas H. Lee Partners.

Hutchins left the firm in 1992 to join the Bill Clinton presidential transition team as a Senior Adviser focusing on economic policy.  After two years serving as a Special Advisor on economic and healthcare policy in the Clinton Administration, Hutchins returned to private equity, this time joining The Blackstone Group in New York.

Hutchins co-founded Silver Lake Partners in 1999 alongside Roger McNamee and David Roux. He left the firm in 2012. As of 2020, Hutchins served as chairman of North Island, an investment firm focused on private equity investments.

Other affiliations
Hutchins serves as a member of the board of NASDAQ OMX Group.  He has previously served as the chairman of Instinet, prior to Silver Lake's exit from that company.  Additionally, he has served on the board of TD Ameritrade, Seagate Technology, MCI, Inc., Gartner and Sabre Holdings.

Hutchins is the Chair of the National Advisory Board of the Hutchins Center for African & African American Research at Harvard University. The Hutchins Family Foundation established the Hutchins Center on Fiscal and Monetary Policy at Brookings. 
 
Hutchins sat on the board of The Federal Reserve Bank of New York, where he was reelected as a Class B director for a three-year term ending December 31, 2018.
Vice Chairman of the Brookings Institution.
A member of the Council on Foreign Relations.
Partial owner of the Boston Celtics.
Member of Center for American Progress Board of Directors

References

External links

1955 births
Living people
American financiers
Boston Celtics owners
Clinton administration personnel
Directors of Harvard Management Company
Federal Reserve Bank people
Harvard Business School alumni
Harvard Law School alumni
Private equity and venture capital investors
Silver Lake (investment firm) people
Lawrenceville School alumni
Brookings Institution people
Harvard College alumni
Federal Reserve Bank of New York